In Greek mythology, Cebriones (Ancient Greek: Κεβριόνης, Kebriones) was the illegitimate son of King Priam of Troy and a slave.

Mythology 
In the  Iliad he was the half-brother of Hector and his final charioteer during the Trojan War. Along with Hector and Paris he was part of the division that finally breached the Argive wall.  Patroclus, the Achaean warrior, killed him by throwing a "shining stone," hitting him in the forehead and knocking his eyes out of his head.  The force of the blow flung him from Hector's chariot, leading Patroclus to remark that with his great "diving" ability, he could have satisfied many by diving for oysters in the "storming sea".

Cebriones was also the name of a giant featured in the Gigantomachy and mentioned in Artistophanes' play The Birds.

See also
 List of children of Priam

Notes

References 

 Gaius Julius Hyginus, Fabulae from The Myths of Hyginus translated and edited by Mary Grant. University of Kansas Publications in Humanistic Studies. Online version at the Topos Text Project.
 Homer, The Iliad with an English Translation by A.T. Murray, Ph.D. in two volumes. Cambridge, MA., Harvard University Press; London, William Heinemann, Ltd. 1924. Online version at the Perseus Digital xLibrary.
 Homer, Homeri Opera in five volumes. Oxford, Oxford University Press. 1920. Greek text available at the Perseus Digital Library.
 Pseudo-Apollodorus, The Library with an English Translation by Sir James George Frazer, F.B.A., F.R.S. in 2 Volumes, Cambridge, MA, Harvard University Press; London, William Heinemann Ltd. 1921. Online version at the Perseus Digital Library. Greek text available from the same website.

Trojans
Children of Priam
Princes in Greek mythology